"Suave (Kiss Me)" is a song by American singer Nayer featuring Swedish-Congolese singer-songwriter Mohombi and American rapper Pitbull. It was released on August 2, 2011 by Mr. 305 and 2101 Records (Universal Music). Produced by RedOne and Jimmy Joker, the song interpolates elements from the 1998 Elvis Crespo song "Suavemente". It follows Pitbull's Billboard Hot 100 number-one single,"Give Me Everything" which featured additional vocals by Nayer. The song has charted at number 34 on the Canadian Hot 100.

Music video
The official music video was released onto Nayer's official VEVO channel on October 31, 2011.

It features Nayer in black dress, with Mohombi, in a white dress, with Pitbull. It also features an island themed style, and with Mohombi in sleeveless shirts, Nayer in a black catsuit, and Pitbull in white suit. It also features some scenes in black and white. A cave scene was filmed at the end, with Nayer and Mohombi dancing in it.

As of June 2020, the video has received over 53 million views.

Track listing
Digital download
"Suave (Kiss Me)" – 3:42

Charts

Release history

References

External links

2011 singles
Mohombi songs
Pitbull (rapper) songs
Song recordings produced by RedOne
2011 songs
Songs written by RedOne
Songs written by Bilal Hajji
Songs written by Pitbull (rapper)
Songs written by Geraldo Sandell
Songs written by AJ Junior
Songs written by Jimmy Thörnfeldt
Songs written by Elvis Crespo